Discoteuthis is a genus of squid in the family Cycloteuthidae. It is distinguished from the genus Cycloteuthis by the absence of a tail on the mantle. The genus occurs in tropical and subtropical oceans worldwide.

The genus contains bioluminescent species.

References

External links
 Tree of Life web project: Discoteuthis

Cephalopod genera
Squid
Bioluminescent molluscs